The 2011–12 FA Cup (also known as The FA Cup with Budweiser for sponsorship reasons) was the 131st season of the world's oldest football knock-out competition, the FA Cup. The closing date for applications was 1 April 2011, and saw 825 clubs apply to enter. On 8 July 2011, the FA announced that 763 clubs had been accepted, which remains, as of 2022-23, the record number of entrants. The final was played on 5 May 2012 at Wembley Stadium. Chelsea won their fourth title in 6 years, and seventh overall, with a 2–1 victory over Liverpool.

This is the first season that the tournament is sponsored by Budweiser. The defending champions, Manchester City, were defeated 3–2 by their rivals Manchester United in the Third Round.

The competition was overshadowed by the collapse of Bolton Wanderers midfielder Fabrice Muamba during their Sixth Round match with Tottenham Hotspur. Muamba went into cardiac arrest on the pitch and, following failed attempts to resuscitate him, was taken to the London Chest Hospital, where he went on to recover despite his heart stopping for over 75 minutes. The match was subsequently abandoned. On 27 March the match was replayed, with Tottenham winning 3–1. Muamba attended the final to congratulate Chelsea.

The winners of the competition would have earned a place in the group stage of the 2012–13 UEFA Europa League. However, since Chelsea went on to win the 2011–12 UEFA Champions League, they qualified for the 2012–13 UEFA Champions League as the title holders. The FA Cup berth for European qualification was not exercised as runners-up Liverpool had already won that season's League Cup and Tottenham Hotspur, the fourth-place finishers in the Premier League, lost their Champions League spot at the expense of sixth-placed Chelsea, as no association was allowed more than four entrants in the competition at the time and so were compensated by UEFA with a place in the Europa League group stage.

Teams

Calendar 
The calendar for the 2011–12 FA Cup, as announced by The Football Association:

Qualifying rounds

All of the teams that entered the competition and were not members of the Premier League or the Football League had to compete in the qualifying rounds.

First round proper
Teams from Leagues One and Two entered at this stage, along with the winners from the fourth round qualifying. The draw was made on 30 October 2011 and ties were played on the weekend of 12–13 November 2011. Redbridge, from the 8th tier of English football, were the lowest ranked football team to make it through to the first round proper.

 Player of the round: Stefan Brown (AFC Totton, 38% of the vote).The other nominees were: Adam Watkins (Luton Town, 24%), Nahki Wells (Bradford City, 21%), Jamie Vardy (Fleetwood Town, 14%) and George Williams (MK Dons, 3%).

Second round proper
The winners of the First Round matches advanced to this stage. The draw was made on 13 November 2011 with the ties played on the weekend of 3–4 December 2011.

Redbridge, from the 8th tier of English football, were the lowest ranked football team to make it to the Second Round Proper.

 Player of the Round: Stuart Nelson (Notts County, 43% of the vote).The other nominees were: Matt Tubbs (Crawley Town, 24%), Jamie Tolley (Wrexham, 17%), Matt Ritchie (Swindon Town, 13%) and Jon Nurse (Dagenham & Redbridge, 3%).

Third round proper
The winners of the second round matches played alongside all twenty teams from the Barclays Premier League and all twenty four teams from the Championship. The draw was made on 4 December 2011, with the ties scheduled to be played on 6, 7, 8, and 9 January 2012. Salisbury City, from the sixth tier, were the lowest ranked club in the Third Round Proper.

 Player of the Round: Hatem Ben Arfa (Newcastle United, 43% of the vote).The other nominees were: Adrian Cieslewicz (Wrexham, 24%), Matt Phillips (Blackpool, 19%), Matt Ritchie (Swindon Town, 12%) and Arnaud Mendy (Macclesfield Town, 3%).

Fourth round proper
The winners of the third round played in this round. The draw was made on 8 January 2012, with the ties scheduled to be played on the weekend of 28–29 January 2012. The lowest ranked clubs that participated in this round were Crawley Town and Swindon Town, from the fourth tier.

 Player of the Round: Will Buckley (Brighton & Hove Albion, 44% of the vote).The other nominees were: Jed Steer (Norwich City, 24%), Jermaine Beckford (Leicester City, 24%), Robin van Persie (Arsenal, 4%) and Matt Tubbs (Crawley Town, 3%).

Fifth round proper
The winners of the fourth round matches progressed to this round. The draw was made live on ITV1 and ESPN on 29 January 2012, with the ties scheduled to be played on the weekend of 18–19 February 2012. Crawley Town were the lowest-ranked team in the fifth round for the second season running and the only club remaining from the fourth tier of the English league system.

Player of the Round: Kieran Richardson (Sunderland, 60% of the vote).The other nominees were: Colin Doyle (Birmingham City, 19%), Mark Roberts (Stevenage, 10%), Curtis Davies (Birmingham City, 9%) and David Nugent (Leicester City, 1%).

Sixth round proper
The draw for the sixth round took place on 19 February 2012 following the match between Stevenage and Tottenham Hotspur. Ties were played on the weekend of 17–18 March. Leicester City were the lowest-ranked team in the sixth round, and were the only club remaining from the second tier of the English league system.

 Player of the Round: Nikica Jelavić (Everton, 63% of the votes).The other nominees were: Tim Cahill (Everton 15%), Stewart Downing (Liverpool, 12%), Fernando Torres (Chelsea, 6%) and Ádám Bogdán (Bolton Wanderers, 5%)

Semi-finals
Ties were played on the weekend of 14–15 April. All four semi-final teams were from the Premier League, and both semi-finals were local derbies, with a London derby between Tottenham Hotspur and Chelsea, and a Merseyside derby between Liverpool and Everton both played at Wembley Stadium.

 Player of the Round: Didier Drogba (Chelsea, 39% of the votes).The other nominees were: Luis Suárez, Liverpool, 33%), Frank Lampard (Chelsea, 16%), Ramires (Chelsea, 6%) and Brad Jones (Liverpool, 6%).

Final

Top scorers
Correct as of 5 May 2012.

Media coverage

From the first round proper onwards, selected matches from the FA Cup are broadcast live both in the UK and Ireland by ESPN and ITV, while S4C broadcast in Wales. ESPN broadcast 25 live games including the final while ITV broadcast 17 live games also including the final and the draws for the next round. S4C, in Welsh.

These matches were broadcast live on television in the UK.

Welsh language channel S4C broadcast live coverage of selected matches involving a Welsh club, which were two Wrexham matches. Their first round proper match at Cambridge United and their third round proper replay at home to Brighton & Hove Albion. Those were the only FA Cup matches that S4C broadcast.

International broadcasters

References

External links 
 The FA Cup at thefa.com

 
2011-12
2011–12 domestic association football cups